Peroxisomal acyl-coenzyme A oxidase 1 is an enzyme that in humans is encoded by the ACOX1 gene.

The protein encoded by this gene is the first enzyme of the fatty acid beta-oxidation pathway, which catalyzes the desaturation of acyl-CoAs to 2-trans-enoyl-CoAs. It donates electrons directly to molecular oxygen, thereby producing hydrogen peroxide. Defects in this gene result in pseudoneonatal adrenoleukodystrophy, a disease that is characterized by accumulation of very long chain fatty acids. Alternatively spliced transcript variants encoding different isoforms have been identified.

See also
 ACOX3
 Acyl-CoA oxidase

References

External links

Further reading

Human proteins